"It's a Wrap" is a song by American singer Mary J. Blige. It was written by Blige, Eminem, Sean Combs, and Mario Winans for her sixth studio album Love & Life (2003), with production helmed by Eminem, Combs and Winans. Released in late August 2004, it served as the album's fifth and final single. "It's a Wrap" peaked at number 71 on US Billboard Hot R&B/Hip-Hop Songs.

Track listings

Charts

References 

2004 singles
Mary J. Blige songs
Music videos directed by Sanaa Hamri
2013 songs
Songs written by Mario Winans
Songs written by Mary J. Blige
Songs written by Eminem
Songs written by Sean Combs
Geffen Records singles